Zeyn ol Dini (also Romanized as Zeyn ol Dīnī, Zeyn ed Dīnī, and Zeyn od Dīnī; also known as Zainadoni, Zandūnī, Zeinoddin, Zen Dūnī, Zeyn Denī, and Zeyn od Dīn) is a village in Kal Rural District, Eshkanan District, Lamerd County, Fars Province, Iran. At the 2006 census, its population was 227, in 57 families.

References 

Populated places in Lamerd County